Hibbertia banksii is a species of flowering plant in the family Dilleniaceae and is native to Queensland and New Guinea. It is a shrub with thick, leathery leaves and yellow flowers with about twenty to forty-eight stamens arranged on one side of the two carpels.

Description
There are about twenty to forty-eight stamens and nine to twenty staminodes all arranged on one side of the two carpels, each of which contains two ovules.

Taxonomy
This species was first formally described in 1963 by de Candolle in Regni Vegetabilis Systema Naturale from an unpublished description by Robert Brown, and was given the name Hemistemma banksii. The type specimens were collected by Joseph Banks near the Endeavour River. In 1863, George Bentham changed the name to Hibbertia acerosa in Flora Australiensis.

Distribution and habitat
This hibbertia grows on the edge of swamps and river banks on the Cape York Peninsula as far south as the Daintree River in far north Queensland and in southern New Guinea.

Conservation status
Goodenia banksii is classified as of "least concern" under the Queensland Government Nature Conservation Act 1992.

See also
List of Hibbertia species

References

banksii
Flora of Western Australia
Plants described in 1817
Taxa named by Alphonse Pyramus de Candolle